Dennis Russell Davies (born April 16, 1944 in Toledo, Ohio) is an American conductor and pianist, He is currently the music director and chief conductor of the Brno Philharmonic.

Biography
Davies studied piano and conducting at the Juilliard School, where he received his doctorate. He was Music Director of the Saint Paul Chamber Orchestra from 1972 to 1980. In 1977 he co-founded the American Composers Orchestra with composer Francis Thorne, and he was its music director until 2002. Davies was music director of the Brooklyn Philharmonic from 1991 to 1996.

In 1980, Davies moved to Stuttgart, Germany, where he was General Music Director of the Baden-Württemberg State Opera House from 1980 to 1987. There he premiered two Philip Glass operas, along with many standard operas, often in productions with innovative and unusual staging. He has worked with many directors, including Robert Altman in a collaboration on Salome in Hamburg. He has also held permanent posts with the Stuttgart Chamber Orchestra, the Orchestra of the Beethovenhalle Bonn (1987–95), and the Vienna Radio Symphony Orchestra. Davies was chief conductor of the Bruckner Orchestra Linz and the Linz Opera from 2002 to 2017. In March 2008, Davies was named the third music director of the Sinfonieorchester Basel, effective with the 2009-10 season, for an initial contract of five years. He held the post through the 2016-17 season. In September 2017, the Brno Philharmonic announced the appointment of Davies as its next principal conductor, effective with the 2018-19 season, with an initial contract of four seasons.

Davies has also led many festival orchestras, including the Aspen Music Festival, the Cabrillo Festival of Contemporary Music, which he directed from 1974 to 1990, and the Saratoga Music Festival. He conducted Der fliegende Holländer at the Bayreuth Festival, the third American to conduct there, and taught orchestral conducting at the Salzburg Mozarteum.

Davies's recordings of note include Copland's Appalachian Spring with the Saint Paul Chamber Orchestra in 1979, for which he won a Grammy Award; Arvo Pärt's Fratres and Miserere; and many of Philip Glass's operas and symphonies, including the 5th symphony, which is dedicated to Davies. He premiered Glass' Symphony No. 10 at a 2012 New Year's concert in Linz. On Glass's 80th birthday, January 31, 2017, Davies premiered Glass' Symphony No. 11 at Carnegie Hall in New York. Lou Harrison's 3rd Symphony is also dedicated to Davies.

Davies has had a long-standing association with the jazz pianist Keith Jarrett. He has conducted Jarrett in classical concerto repertoire (including Mozart, Lou Harrison and Alan Hovhaness) and has himself performed Jarrett's music for piano and conducted Jarrett's orchestral music (featuring Jarrett as soloist as well as saxophonist Jan Garbarek).

References

External links
 Official Website
 Dr Raab & Dr Böhm Künstleragentur agency biography of Dennis Russell Davies
 2 interviews with Dennis Russell Davies, January 6, 1982 & December 8, 1987

American male conductors (music)
Aspen Music Festival and School faculty
Grammy Award winners
1944 births
Living people
Musicians from Toledo, Ohio
Juilliard School alumni
American classical pianists
American male classical pianists
20th-century American conductors (music)
20th-century classical pianists
21st-century American conductors (music)
21st-century classical pianists
20th-century American pianists
Educators from Ohio
Classical musicians from Ohio
20th-century American male musicians
21st-century American male musicians
21st-century American pianists